David Attell (born January 18, 1965)  is an American stand-up comedian, actor and writer best known as the host of Comedy Central's Insomniac with Dave Attell, which earned him a cult following. His work has drawn admiration from many comedians.

Early life
Attell was born in the New York City borough of Queens to a Jewish family. He was raised in Rockville Centre, New York, on Long Island. He graduated from South Side High School.

After graduating from New York University in 1987 with a degree in communications, Attell began performing at open-mic nights.

Career

Attell's first appearance on television was in 1988 on VH1's Stand-Up Spotlight, which also featured early appearances by Lewis Black, Margaret Cho, Jeff Garlin, Jay Mohr and Wanda Sykes.

On November 23, 1993, he made his first appearance on Late Show with David Letterman. The appearance was seen by Saturday Night Live creator Lorne Michaels, who then recruited Attell to be a writer, and occasional performer, on SNL. Attell can be seen behind Chris Farley during the "Rudy Giuliani Inauguration" sketch. Attell worked on the show for the 1993–94 season.

In 1995, Attell was featured on two HBO specials: alongside up-and-comers Louis C.K. and Dave Chappelle. He was a featured performer on the 1995 Young Comedians Special hosted by Garry Shandling. He was given his own 60-minute special on the channel's HBO Comedy Showcase. Subsequently, Attell was also given an episode of HBO Comedy Half-Hour in 1997. Attell's first one-hour special, Dave Attell: Captain Miserable aired December 8, 2007, on HBO.

His comedy special Dave Attell: Road Work aired 2014 on Comedy Central.

In 1995, Attell appeared as Squiggly Dave on Dr. Katz, Professional Therapist.  In 1999, the network issued Attell an installment in the second season of Comedy Central Presents series.

The same year the network signed him as a regular commentator to its satirical news series The Daily Show with Jon Stewart, on which he appeared for three years. Attell's commentary segment was called "The Ugly American". He returned for the finale episode of host Stewart's tenure.

In 2001, the television series Insomniac with Dave Attell premiered on Comedy Central. Attell described it as "Wild on E! for Ugly People". 

In 2003, Attell began appearing on Tough Crowd with Colin Quinn. The show featured many of the performers he works with at the New York City comedy club the Comedy Cellar and is based on the conversations they would have off-stage at the Olive Tree Cafe, the restaurant above the club.

Attell appeared on Comedy Central's Last Laugh in 2007. In 2008, Attell began hosting The Gong Show with Dave Attell for Comedy Central. Like the 1970s version, the show had a rotating panel of celebrity judges grading unusual acts.

Other notable television roles featuring Attell:
 "Dave" in a couple of the early episodes of Everybody Loves Raymond
 The voice of "Frank Demore" on Crank Yankers
 "Brad Campbell" on Ed
 Himself on Arrested Development

In May 2008, Attell announced a casting call on his MySpace page for Comedy Central's relaunch of The Gong Show. Attell was host, along with Greg Fitzsimmons serving as head writer on the series. However, The Gong Show with Dave Attell aired only from July to September 2008.

In January 2010, he co-hosted the AVN Awards show, along with porn actresses Kirsten Price and Kayden Kross; and again in 2012 with co-hostesses Sunny Leone and Bree Olson.

Attell returned to television on Showtime beginning October 20, 2011, in Dave's Old Porn, a TV series in which Attell views and jokes about retro 1970s and 1980s pornographic movies with different guest comedians. Typically, during a given show, Attell and his guest view clips that give an overview of a particular retro porn star's career. Near the end of that show, that particular porn actor appears and also comments on clips from some of his or her movies.

In April 2014, Comedy Central premiered Comedy Underground with Dave Attell, a late-night stand-up comedy show taped live in New York.

In 2018 he toured with Jeff Ross on the Bumping Mics Tour. Over the last three days of the tour they taped a three-part documentary series, Bumping Mics with Jeff Ross & Dave Attell for Netflix. Interspersed footage showcases the duo's interactions both off-stage and on as they return to the Comedy Cellar, where a spontaneous first performance marked the birth of their ensemble act.

Film appearances
Attell played the role of "Don" in Los Enchiladas!, a film written, produced and directed by comedian Mitch Hedberg, starring Hedberg as well as fellow comedians Todd Barry and Marc Maron.

In the short film The Office Party, Attell once again played the role of "Don". The film co-starred ex-Karate Kid Ralph Macchio, Jon Stewart, Carol Kane and Tate Donovan. The film was written and directed by Daily Show producer Chiara Edmands.

Pootie Tang saw Attell as the bumbling corporate lackey, "Frank". The film was written and directed by his friend Louis C.K. It co-starred Lance Crouther, Wanda Sykes and Chris Rock among others.

Attell also played "Efram the Driver" in the Independent feature My Suicidal Sweetheart, written and directed by filmmaking newcomer Michael Parness. The film co-starred Natasha Lyonne, David Krumholtz, Tim Blake Nelson, Lorraine Bracco, David Paymer, and Rosanna Arquette.

Attell has cameo appearances in the films Abby Singer and Scary Movie 4.

He plays the character Barker in the 2008 comedy film Harold.

Attell had a cameo appearance in the Judd Apatow film Funny People which starred Adam Sandler.
 
He voiced the GPS on the Mystery Machine in the 2010 film Scooby-Doo! Abracadabra-Doo.

He appeared in Trainwreck as the main character's homeless friend Noam.

He appeared in I Feel Pretty as the bartender in the bikini contest scene.

He appeared in the 2017 documentary Gilbert about comedian and actor Gilbert Gottfried.

Filmography

Films

Stand-up releases

Television

Video games

References

External links

Dave Attell at the Comedy Hall of Fame

1965 births
Living people
Male actors from New York City
Jewish American male actors
American stand-up comedians
Jewish male comedians
New York University alumni
American male comedians
American male film actors
American male television actors
American male voice actors
People from Queens, New York
People from Rockville Centre, New York
21st-century American male actors
20th-century American male actors
20th-century American comedians
21st-century American comedians
Comedians from New York City
Jewish American male comedians
South Side High School (Rockville Centre) alumni
21st-century American Jews